Task Force 61 (CTF-61) is a task force of the United States Navy that today denotes what used to be designated the Mediterranean Amphibious ready group (MARG) of the United States Sixth Fleet. It is composed of approximately three Amphibious assault ships, but in 2008 is designated the Expeditionary Strike Group that includes their embarked landing craft. From these ships, United States Marine Corps ground forces can move ashore by sea and air in amphibious assault or emergency evacuation missions. Once ashore, the ships of Task Force 61 are able to logistically support the ground forces, until the objective of the landing has been accomplished.

The TF 61 designation has been used by the United States Navy since World War II.

World War II
Task Force 61 seems to have first been formed in advance of the Guadalcanal campaign of 1942.
Admiral Robert L. Ghormley, Commander, South Pacific Area, issued his Operation Plan No. 1–42 on 16 July 1942. It was to govern the execution of Task One which was to be divided into three phases. The first would be a rehearsal in the Fiji Islands; the second would be the seizure and occupation of Tulagi and Guadalcanal (Operation Watchtower). Additionally, the task force executed Operation Cleanslate on the Russell Islands in August 1942. The projected occupation of Ndeni in the Santa Cruz Islands would be the third and final phase.

Operation Plan No. 1–42 organized two forces, Task Forces 61 and 63. The Expeditionary Force of eighty-two ships (designated as Task Force 61), was to be commanded by Vice-Admiral Frank Jack Fletcher, and included the amphibious force of Task Group 61.2 under Rear Admiral Richmond K. Turner, escorted by the vessels of Task Group 61.1 Rear Admiral Leigh Noyes. The main landing force was to be the 1st Marine Division. Later, in October 1942, the Task Force, now under Rear Admiral Thomas C. Kinkaid, confronted a force directed by Japanese Admiral Isoroku Yamamoto in the same area. In late October, the Task Force consisted of the USS Enterprise, USS South Dakota, the cruisers USS Portland and USS San Juan, and eight destroyers. The Task Force formed one of the two U.S. carrier groups that took part in the Battle of the Santa Cruz Islands. As such it represented the combined command of Task Force 11, Task Force 16 and Task Force 18.

Task Force 61 was dissolved in the Pacific Theater and became Task Group 92.4 while TF-61 was reactivated in the Atlantic under the Royal Navy command, and participated in convoy escort duties, although initially it included US Navy Destroyer Division 60, Destroyer Escort Division 5, and a number of United States Coast Guard and Free French Navy vessels.

Cold War
The TF 61 designation has been used in the Mediterranean since the late 1940s.

In the early 1960s the Task Force included rotation of Amphibious Squadron Six CTF , and Amphibious Squadron Four CTF .

U.S. naval forces in the area remained on high state of readiness through 2 September 1974 as the situation on Cyprus began to stabilize.

In 1982, during the Multi-National Force deployment to Lebanon, the Commander, Amphibious Task Force (CTF 61) was designated Commander, U.S. Forces Lebanon.

Fiction literature
Task Force 61 is the subject of several military fiction novels by David Poyer.

Notes

References
 Lane, Kerry, Guadalcanal Marine, University Press of Mississippi, 2004
 Griffith, Samuel B., The Battle for Guadalcanal, University of Illinois Press, 2000
 Andrews, Jr., Lewis M., Andrews, Lewis M., Tempest, Fire and Foe: Destroyer Escorts in World War II and the Men Who Manned Them, Trafford Publishing, 2004

United States Navy task forces